The Wreck is an Australian film directed by W. J. Lincoln based on a poem by Adam Lindsay Gordon about the ride to help by a farmhand who has witnessed a shipwreck. It is considered a lost film.

The movie was made in 1913 but not released until 1915. W. J. Lincoln later made a film of Gordon's life, The Life's Romance of Adam Lindsay Gordon (1916).

References

External links
 original text of From the Wreck by Adam Lindsay Gordon

1913 films
Australian black-and-white films
Australian silent feature films
Lost Australian films
Films directed by W. J. Lincoln